North Las Vegas Airport  is a public-use airport  northwest of downtown Las Vegas in North Las Vegas, Nevada. It is owned by the Clark County Commission and operated by the Clark County Department of Aviation.

Known locally as Northtown, it is the second–busiest public use government airport in the Las Vegas area and the third busiest in Nevada. It is the primary airport in the Las Vegas area for general aviation and scenic tours, allowing Harry Reid International Airport to focus on airline flights. North Las Vegas offered limited regional airline service by Grand Canyon Scenic Airlines in the early 2000s. Many helicopter operators, including the Las Vegas Metropolitan Police Department, use the airport.

History
The airport opened on December 7, 1941, as Sky Haven Airport.  Given the significance of the date, only one of the three founders, Florence Murphy, remained to run the airport.

Sky Rider Motel opened in the early 1960s during an expansion project at the airport, featuring a swimming pool shaped like an airplane.

In 1968 Hughes Tool Company purchased the airport, then called North Las Vegas Air Terminal.

Facilities
It has three asphalt runways: 7/25 is 5,005 by 75 feet (1,525 x 23 m), 12R/30L is 5,001 by 75 feet (1,524 x 23 m), and 12L/30R is 4,203 by 75 feet (1,281 x 23 m).

In the year ending August 31, 2019, averaged 483 aircraft operations per day, or just over 176,000 per year: 59% local general aviation, 29% transient general aviation, 11% air taxi and <1% of both commercial and military. As of August, 2015, there were 536 aircraft based at this airport: 76% single-engine, 14% multi-engine, 4% jet, 6% helicopter and <1% ultralight.

Runway incursions
The airport has worked on a program to reduce the number of runway incursions at the airport. For the year of 2007, North Las Vegas Airport ranked #2 in airports with most runway incursions.

Incidents and accidents
 On August 30, 1978, Las Vegas Airlines Flight 44, a Piper PA-31-350 Navajo Chieftain (N44LV), crashed in VFR conditions shortly after takeoff from runway 25. Flight 44 was a charter flight from Las Vegas, Nevada to Santa Ana, California, with nine Australian tourists and a pilot on board. After liftoff following a longer-than-normal ground roll, the aircraft pitched nose up, climbed steeply to about 400 ft above the ground, stalled, reversed course, and crashed 1,150 ft beyond and 650 ft to the right of the runway.  All persons on board the aircraft were killed.  The National Transportation Safety Board determined that the probable cause of the accident was a backed out elevator down-stop bolt that limited down elevator travel and made it impossible for the pilot to prevent a pitchup and stall after takeoff. There was no fire.

 On January 2, 2013, a twin-engine Piper Aerostar crashed and burst into flames at North Las Vegas Airport after a hard landing. The two occupants escaped uninjured.

 On July 17, 2022, two single-engine aircraft – a Piper PA-46 Malibu and a Cessna 172 – collided in mid-air in the traffic pattern at the airport. Two people were onboard each aircraft, and all four died. Preliminary reports indicate that the Piper was preparing to land when it hit the 172, and ADSB data shows that the Malibu overshot its final approach course, encroaching on the path of the Cessna, which was landing on a parallel runway.

References

External links
 North Las Vegas Airport – official website
  from Nevada DOT
 
 

Airports established in 1941
Airports in Clark County, Nevada
Buildings and structures in North Las Vegas, Nevada
Transportation in the Las Vegas Valley